Wouly Sybrand de Bie (born 4 March 1958, in Beverwijk) is a former water polo goalkeeper from the Netherlands, who participated in two Summer Olympics. In 1980 he finished in sixth position with the Dutch team. Four years later in Los Angeles, De Bie once again gained the sixth spot in the final rankings with the Netherlands. De Bie was reckoned one of the best goalkeepers of the World in 1982, when he finished first during the Tungsram Cup in Budapest, Hungary, where the top ten teams of the World where present. Direct after that tournament he gained the fourth spot during the World Championships in Guayaquil, Ecuador.

De Bie has over 30 years of experience as an international coach with Dutch, Kuwait, French and Venezuelan club teams, as well as national squads in Kuwait (men), New Zealand (men and women), Canada (women). Since, 2009 he is the National Technical Director and the National Head Coach of Qatar men's Water polo team.

See also
 Netherlands men's Olympic water polo team records and statistics
 List of men's Olympic water polo tournament goalkeepers

References
 Dutch Olympic Committee

External links
 

1958 births
Living people
Sportspeople from Beverwijk
Dutch male water polo players
Water polo goalkeepers
Dutch water polo coaches
Olympic water polo players of the Netherlands
Water polo players at the 1980 Summer Olympics
Water polo players at the 1984 Summer Olympics
20th-century Dutch people